Szilvásszentmárton is a village in Somogy county, Hungary.

Culture
The Hungarian folk song Mit mos, Levél Katicája? was collected in 1891 in Szilvásszentmárton by Áron Kiss.

External links 
 Street map (Hungarian)

References 

Populated places in Somogy County